The Wasaga Beach Public Library is a public library that serves Wasaga Beach, Ontario in Canada. It is governed by a board of trustees appointed by the town council of Wasaga Beach. The chief librarian is Pamela Pal, and the Canadian library symbol is OWAB.

The collection includes adult and junior fiction and non-fiction books, large-print books, audiobooks, e-books, DVDs, and picture books. The library also has accessibility features, including large-print keyboards and screen magnification software. The library also operates a Books on Wheels program.

The original library was a  building built in 1972. It was replaced by a  building in 1994. In 2019, construction of a third 17,252 square foot (1,603 m2) library was announced by the town, as part of joint facility which will include a new twin-pad hockey arena. The project broke ground in September 2021, and is expected to be completed in the summer of 2023.

See also

Ontario Public Libraries

References

External links
Wasaga Beach Public Library

Public libraries in Ontario
Buildings and structures in Simcoe County
Education in Simcoe County